The Sary-Chelek Nature Reserve is located in Aksy District, Jalal-Abad Region in western Kyrgyzstan. Established in 1959, it currently covers 23,868 hectares. In 1978 it was designated as a World Biosphere reserve by UNESCO. The name of Sary Chelek translates as "Yellow bucket" from Kyrgyz language.

Geography
The reserve currently occupies , including s core area, and  transition area. Its headquarters are in the village Arkyt.

Description
The comparatively large Lake Sary-Chelek is the main feature of the nature reserve. In the low hills south of Lake Sary-Chelek there are 6 smaller lakes: Kylaaköl, Iyriköl, Bakalyköl, Aramköl, Chöychökköl, and Chachaköl. The river Kojata divides the nature reserve in an eastern and western part.

References

Biosphere reserves of Kyrgyzstan
Nature reserves in Kyrgyzstan
Jalal-Abad Region
Protected areas established in 1959
1959 in the Kirghiz Soviet Socialist Republic